Jefferson "Jeff" Caldwell (born February 20, 1996) is an American professional soccer player who plays as a goalkeeper for USL Championship club Colorado Springs Switchbacks.

College and amateur
Caldwell played four years of college soccer at the University of Virginia between 2014 and 2017, making 61 appearances.

While at college, Caldwell appeared for USL PDL sides Seattle Sounders FC U-23 and Colorado Rapids U-23.

Professional career

New York City FC 
On January 19, 2018, Caldwell was selected 19th overall in the 2018 MLS SuperDraft by New York City FC. He signed with the club on February 28, 2018.

Loan to Memphis 901 
On March 5, 2019, Caldwell was loaned to USL Championship side Memphis 901 FC for their 2019 season.

New England Revolution 
Caldwell was released by New York City on November 20, 2019. He was selected by New England Revolution in the MLS Waiver Draft on November 25, 2019. He was the third-choice keeper behind Matt Turner and Brad Knighton, and did not make an appearance in the 2020 season with the Revolution.

Hartford Athletic 
On January 27, 2021 Caldwell signed with USL Championship team Hartford Athletic for the 2021 season.

He made his competitive debut with the team on April 30, 2021 against New York Red Bulls II. Caldwell finished the year second in saves  for the USL Championship and tied for 3rd in clean sheets at nine.

Loan to Miami FC 
On November 5, 2021, Caldwell was sent to USL Championship side Miami FC as an emergency loan ahead of the 2021 USL Championship Playoffs. He started for Miami in the team's 1–0 loss to Louisville City FC in the Eastern Conference Quarterfinals.

Colorado Springs Switchbacks
On December 7, 2021, it was announced Caldwell would join USL Championship side Colorado Springs Switchbacks ahead of their 2022 season.

International
Caldwell played in one game with the United States Under-20 Men's National Team in 2015, and also featured for the U-17 and U-18 national teams. He was a member of the United States’ 2013 Concacaf U-17 Championship squad, and was also named to roster for the 2015 FIFA U-20 World Cup, but did not see game action.

References

External links
 
 
 

1996 births
Living people
American soccer players
Association football goalkeepers
Virginia Cavaliers men's soccer players
Seattle Sounders FC U-23 players
Colorado Rapids U-23 players
New York City FC draft picks
New York City FC players
Memphis 901 FC players
New England Revolution players
Hartford Athletic players
Miami FC players
Colorado Springs Switchbacks FC players
USL Championship players
USL League Two players
People from Ashe County, North Carolina
Soccer players from North Carolina
United States men's under-20 international soccer players
United States men's youth international soccer players